Serhiy Levchenko (3 January 1981 – 16 June 2007) was a professional Ukrainian football forward.

Career
In 2001 FC Nafkom-Akademia Irpin paid 100,000 DM to Borussia Mönchengladbach for Levchenko.

On 10 February 2003 he played one game against Egyptian youth team.

On 16 June 2007 Levchenko got killed in a car accident. On the Paton Bridge he was driving at high speeds on his Lexus and after losing control over it, Levchenko ran onto an oncoming traffic and hit a truck. He was survived by his wife and daughter.

References

External links
 
 

1981 births
2007 deaths
Footballers from Kyiv
Ukrainian footballers
Ukrainian Premier League players
Borussia Mönchengladbach II players
FC Nafkom Brovary players
FC Metalurh Zaporizhzhia players
FC Spartak Sumy players
Ukrainian expatriate footballers
Expatriate footballers in Germany
Ukraine under-21 international footballers
Road incident deaths in Ukraine
Association football forwards